"Life Is Show Time" (stylized as "Life is SHOW TIME") is the debut solo single of Golden Bomber vocalist Shō Kiryūin (credited as "Shō Kiryūin from Golden Bomber"). It serves as the opening theme song to the 2012 Kamen Rider Series Kamen Rider Wizard. In recording the song, Kiryūin stated that he felt closer to being like his idol Gackt, who performed a previous Kamen Rider Series' theme song in 2009.

Overview
"Life Is Show Time" performed well on Japan's various music charts, reaching number 3 on the Oricon's Weekly Chart on the week of its release, a debut at number 1 on the Daily Charts, and an overall 11 on the Monthly Charts for October. On dwango's Ring Tone download charts, it debuted at number 1, with other number 1's on the Billboard Japan Hot 100 and Japan Hot Singles Sales charts. It also reached 20 on the Billboard Japan Hot Top Airplay chart and number 3 on Count Down TVs chart.

Music video
The music video for "Life Is Show Time" features Japanese professional wrestler Hiroshi Tanahashi, professional boxer Daiki Kameda, and judoka Keiji Suzuki battling Ghouls, the low level enemies that Kamen Rider Wizard also battles.

Track listing

References

Japanese-language songs
Japanese television drama theme songs
2012 singles
Avex Group singles
Kamen Rider Wizard
2012 in Japanese music
Billboard Japan Hot 100 number-one singles
Songs with lyrics by Shoko Fujibayashi
2012 songs